Stonewall Creek Falls is a waterfall located in Rabun County, Georgia. Accessible only by a nine-mile mountain bike or hiking trail, these falls receive little traffic and are quite secluded.

References

Waterfalls of Georgia (U.S. state)
Protected areas of Rabun County, Georgia
Chattahoochee-Oconee National Forest
Waterfalls of Rabun County, Georgia